Abdoli (also Romanized as ‘Abdolī and ‘Abdelī) is a village in Shoaybiyeh-ye Sharqi Rural District, Shadravan District, Shushtar County, Khuzestan Province, Iran. At the 2006 census, its population was 410, in 69 families.

References 

Populated places in Shushtar County